Molare is a comune (municipality) in the Province of Alessandria in the Italian region Piedmont, located about  southeast of Turin and about  south of Alessandria.

Molare borders the following municipalities: Cassinelle, Cremolino, Ovada, Ponzone, Rossiglione, and Tiglieto.

Demographic evolution

References

Molare